Olax is a plant genus in the family Olacaceae. 
The name derives from the  Latin, olax   (malodorous), and refers to the unpleasant scent of some of the Olax species. Olax is an Old World genus represented by several climbers, some species have leaves  and fruits smelling  of garlic such as Olax subscorpioidea and Olax gambecola, seeds of the latter are used as condiments in parts of West Africa. In India Olax nana is well known as one of the first species to emerge after forest fires, the shoots growing directly from buried roots.

Species
The type species is O. zeylanica.  According to Plants of the world online the genus contains the following fifty-three species:

 Olax acuminata Wall. ex Benth.
 Olax angulata A.S.George
 Olax angustifolia Compère
 Olax antsiranensis Z.S.Rogers, Malécot & Sikes
 Olax aphylla R.Br.
 Olax aschersoniana Büttner
 Olax aurantia A.S.George
 Olax austrosinensis Y.R.Ling
 Olax benthamiana Miq.
 Olax candida (Poepp.) Christenh. & Byng
 Olax capuronii Z.S.Rogers,  Malécot & Sikes
 Olax crassa (Monach.) Christenh. & Byng
 Olax cyanocarpa (Sleumer) Christenh. & Byng
 Olax dissitiflora Oliv.
 Olax egleri (Bastos) Christenh. & Byng
 Olax emirnensis Baker
 Olax gambecola Baill.
 Olax gardneriana Benth.
 Olax gossweileri Exell & Mendonça
 Olax guianensis (Engl.) Christenh. & Byng
 Olax hypoleuca Baill.
 Olax imbricata Roxb.
 Olax inopiflora (Miers)  Christenh. & Byng
 Olax lanceolata Cavaco & Keraudren
 Olax latifolia Engl.
 Olax laxiflora Ridl.
 Olax macrophylla Benth.
 Olax madagascariensis (DC.) Cavaco
 Olax mannii Oliv.
 Olax mayottensis Z.S.Rogers, Malécot & Sikes
 Olax nana Wall. ex Benth.
 Olax obcordata A.S.George
 Olax obtusa Blume
 Olax obtusifolia De Wild.
 Olax papillosa (Bastos) Christenh. & Byng
 Olax pauciflora Benth.
 Olax pendula L.S.Sm.
 Olax pentandra Sleumer
 Olax phyllanthi R.Br.
 Olax psittacorum (Lam.) Vahl
 Olax redmondii (Steyerm.) Christenh. & Byng
 Olax retusa F.Muell. ex Benth.
 Olax scalariformis A.S.George
 Olax scandens Roxb.
 Olax singularis (Vell.)  Christenh. & Byng
 Olax spartea A.S.George
 Olax staudtii Engl.
 Olax stricta R.Br.
 Olax subscorpioidea Oliv.
 Olax tepuiensis (Steyerm.) Christenh. & Byng
 Olax triplinervia Oliv.
 Olax wildemanii Engl.
 Olax zeylanica L.

Gallery

References

Olacaceae
Santalales genera
Taxonomy articles created by Polbot